Aïchetou Mint Ahmedou is a Mauritanian writer, working in French.

Born in Boutilimit, Ahmedou completed her primary and secondary schooling in Nouakchott, where she then studied the sciences. She has written poetry, articles, and stories, many of which have been published locally in Nouakchott, and has produced translations of Arabic-language poetry as well. In the 1990s she began work on a novel, La couleur de vent, which was published in 2014. She has spoken about her work at literary conferences.

Publications
 La couleur du vent : il était une fois à Nouakchott : roman, 2011

References

Living people
People from Boutilimit
Mauritanian women writers
Mauritanian poets
Mauritanian novelists
Mauritanian translators
Mauritanian women poets
Women novelists
20th-century poets
20th-century women writers
21st-century poets
21st-century novelists
21st-century translators
21st-century women writers
Year of birth missing (living people)